The 1978 Bulgarian Cup Final was the 38th final of the Bulgarian Cup (in this period the tournament was named Cup of the Soviet Army), and was contested between CSKA Sofia and Marek Dupnitsa on 24 May 1978 at Vasil Levski National Stadium in Sofia. Marek won the final 1–0.

Match

Details

See also
1977–78 A Group

References

Bulgarian Cup finals
PFC CSKA Sofia matches
Cup Final